The Digital Q1 was a FUJIFILM digital camera model announced in 2003.

Its expected street price was listed at around £100.

Features
The Digital Q1 is a compact 2 megapixel digital camera described as a budget beginners camera. The camera has 3 resolutions, plus a function to record compressed, low-resolution video (AVI format). It can be used as a webcam via the USB port. The DIGITAL Q1 is a low-cost, beginners model – only date and time need to be set. A 16 Mbyte xD card is included. The camera includes a battery-backed clock, allowing time and date to be included in the Exif record, which also includes shutter times. There are menu options to adjust brightness (and other) parameters, with little effect – the firmware aligns to a medium result.

 1/2" CMOS sensor
 4x digital zoom
 ISO 100, 200
 Built in flash
 Red-eye reduction
 Focal length = 46mm on a 35mm camera
 1.5" colour LCD screen
 Focus: 120 cm to infinity
 Macro focus: approx. 60 to 120 cm
 File format: JPEG, AVI
 Memory: 8MB internal, optional xD-Picture Card
 USB output and cable
 Batteries: 2 x AA alkaline
 Neck strap

Reception
Computer Active criticized the lack of optical zoom and plastic body, and rated the camera 3 out of 5 stars, saying: "As a fun snapper for holidays, nights out, or maybe as a first camera for the kids, it has plenty going for it. Serious photo fans should keep shopping."

Weblinks

References

External links
News story and press release on DPReview website

Fujifilm digital cameras
Point-and-shoot cameras